is a set of three Japanese romance visual novels developed by KID for the PlayStation 2. They are the sequels to Memories Off and Memories Off 2nd. The game volumes were released for the PlayStation 2 on January 27, 2005.

Characters

After Rain Volume 1: Orizuru

After Rain Volume 2: Souen

Media

Music
The opening for the game is Ribbon and the ending song is After Rain, both sung by Ayane.

External links
 SuperLite 2000's Memories Off After Rain Volume 1 page
 SuperLite 2000's Memories Off After Rain Volume 2 page
 SuperLite 2000's Memories Off After Rain Volume 3 page
 Official PSP port website

2005 video games
Bishōjo games
Japan-exclusive video games
KID games
Memories Off
PlayStation 2 games
PlayStation Portable games
Romance video games
Video games developed in Japan
Video games scored by Takeshi Abo
Visual novels
Windows games